The Unholy Terror is the third studio album by underground hip hop collective Army of the Pharaohs. The album was released on March 30, 2010. The album debuted in the Billboard 200 at number 179 selling 3,200 units in its first week of release. The album welcomes two new members: Block McCloud and Journalist.

Track listing

References

External links
 .
 Official Enemy Soil Site.

Army of the Pharaohs albums
2010 albums
Enemy Soil Records albums
Babygrande Records albums